Ramón Buenaventura Báez Méndez (July 14, 1812March 14, 1884), was a Dominican politician and military figure. He was president of the Dominican Republic for five nonconsecutive terms. His rule was characterized by being corrupt and governing for the benefit of his personal fortune.

Genealogical studies have identified Buenaventura Báez as one of the  fathers of the modern Dominican oligarchy, with many of his descendants dominating the political and economic life of the Dominican Republic today.

He fathered several children, nine of which he recognized, while some were born in the Dominican Republic, others were born in Puerto Rico and France.

Early years and family

Báez was born in Rincón (now Cabral) in the Captaincy General of Santo Domingo, he was raised in his father's hometown Azua. Báez was the son of Pablo Altagracia Báez and Teresa de Jesús Méndez. 

His father Pablo, a wealthy merchant from Azua, was left in an orphanage when he was born, as he was the result of an extra marital affair between Josefa Morales de Firpo (a married Spanish woman) and priest and author, Father Antonio Sánchez-Valverde. Pablo was raised by a French silversmith (a factor that generated a deep francophilia in both Pablo and Buenaventura) known as Monsieur Capellier, and became a wealthy businessman, slaveholder and politician. Teresa de Jesús Méndez was a mixed-race former slave from Rincón. She was born to a slave and a master, and was sold to Pablo Altagracia Báez, who freed her to take her as his mistress when his wife María Quezada told him to do so when realized that she was infertile herself; Pablo and Teresa had 7 children.

Báez was light-haired and blue-eyed like his father but had curly hair and was somewhat swarthy, earning the nickname of Jabao. Cultured and good-looking, Báez was very popular among women, especially because of his gallantry. Due to his family's fortune he was able to study in Europe, particularly France. In the European continent he learned various languages including English and French. When his father died in 1841, Báez, aged 29, inherited a large fortune that he used assiduously in politics, becoming elected in 1843 deputy to the Haitian Constituent Assembly.

Political career

From 1843 Báez served as deputy of Azua to the ruling Haitian government. This post was gained in part because of his role in the revolution that overthrew President Jean-Pierre Boyer from power. As a deputy, Báez led a faction of Dominicans that tried to remove the anti-white bias in the Haitian Constitution, but failed. 

Báez was, at first, completely and totally against any move to leave the union with Haiti. Then, on 15 December 1843 Báez, as leader of the Dominican legislative faction, proposed to French consul Auguste Levasseur to establish a French protectorate in the Spanish-speaking side of the island with a governor appointed by Paris, in exchange for guns and warships to compel or fight Port-au-Prince for a retreat. Consul Levasseur was very well disposed and constantly exchanged correspondence between Paris and the conspirators.

When the independence revolution started, he opposed the Trinitarians and imprisoned some of them, tried futilely to prevent the publication of a copy of the Act of Independence in January 1844 in Azua, and in February did not allow the  flag of the newly Dominican state to be raised in the city plaza; in part, he was very pessimistic due to the numerical superiority of Haitians and thought that a rebellion against Port-au-Prince with no foreign support was futile. He changed his mind once he saw the popular fervor and decided that the time had come to part ways with Port-au-Prince.

In 1844, Báez helped to lead a successful rebellion against Haiti, which established the independence of the Dominican Republic. He went to Europe in 1846 to convince France to establish a protectorate over the Dominican Republic, but the French refused. As president for the first time, from 1849 until 1853, he attempted to convince the United States to take over the country. He was president again from 1856 until 1857, when he was deposed in a coup.

Báez next supported the idea of having the Dominican Republic be taken over by Spain. He went into exile in Spain and led a luxurious life there. The Spanish agreed to occupy the Dominican Republic in 1861, but by 1865 they had abandoned it (see Dominican Restoration War). Báez then returned to the Dominican Republic and became president again until he was deposed in another coup in May 1866. He then served his longest term as president, from 1868 until 1874, during which time he again attempted to have the United States annex the Dominican Republic. This time he was almost successful, as he convinced American President Ulysses S. Grant to send warships to the Dominican Republic, and drew up an annexation treaty which reached the United States Senate floor. The treaty, however, was not ratified in the US Senate, as there was widespread opposition to absorbing a nation with so many black and mixed race inhabitants. The treaty became an embarrassment for Grant.

In 1869, Báez negotiated for a loan with Edward Hartmont, a  British financier. The loan was agreed under exorbitant sums under the country, Hartmont promised £420,000 but only under harsh conditions. To receive the loan, the Dominican state had to pay a £100,000 commission on their customs receipts. Besides this, the nation's coal mines and forests were to be mortgaged. However, Báez only managed to receive £56,000, of which some ended up in his and his supporter's own pockets, the remaining was used to crush his opponents.

Exile and death

Báez became President again from 1876 until 1878, when he was deposed in a final coup and sent into exile to Puerto Rico, at the time a Spanish colony, where he lived his final days. He is buried in the Basilica Cathedral of Santa María la Menor.

Offspring 
Genealogical studies have identified President Báez, and President Espaillat as well, as the most recent common ancestors for most of the Dominican oligarchy, since their offspring managed to establish bonds with the most rich and powerful families from Santiago, and thus, from the country.

'''Ramón Buenaventura Báez Méndez (1812–1884)
Manuel Báez Batista (1839–?)
Teodoro Osvaldo Buenaventura Báez Machado (1857–?)
José Ramón Báez López-Penha (1909–1995)
Buenaventura Báez López-Penha (1907-?)
Marcos Antonio Báez Cocco
Ana Josefina Báez Cocco (b. 1948)
Monika De Marchena Báez
Juan Rafael Vargas De Marchena
Patricia De Marchena Báez
Freddy De Marchena Báez (b. 1980)
Freddy Alejandro De Marchena Grullón (b. 2008)
Jimena De Marchena Báez
Soraya Báez Cocco
Jesus Báez
Alejandro Buenaventura Báez Cocco
Altagracia Amelia Báez Andújar (†1879)
José María Cabral y Báez (1864–1937)
Amelia María Cabral Bermúdez (1899–1996)
Juan Bautista Vicini Cabral (1924–2015)
Felipe Augusto Antonio Vicini Lluberes (b. 1960)
Amelia Stella María Vicini Lluberes (b. 1974)
 Juan Bautista Vicini Lluberes (b. 1975)
Laura Amelia Vicini Cabral de Barletta (1925–2006)
José María Vicini Cabral (1926–2007)
José Leopoldo Vicini Pérez
Marco Vicini Pérez
Felipe Vicini Cabral (1936–1997)
Auristela Cabral Bermúdez (1901–1988)
Donald Joseph Reid Cabral (1923–2006)
William John Reid Cabral (1925–2010)
Patricia Reid Baquero (b. 1953)
Isabela Egan Reid de Pittaluga
Meghan Egan Reid
Robert Reid Cabral (1929–1961)
José María Cabral Bermúdez (1902–1984)
María Josefina Cabral Vega
Manuel Díez Cabral (b. 1964)
José María Cabral Vega
Amalia Josefina Gabriela Cabral Lluberes (b. 1963)
Claudia Cabral Lluberes (b. 1964)
Ana Amelia Batlle Cabral
Laura Emilia Batlle Cabral
José María Cabral Lluberes (b. 1967)
Petrica Cabral Vega (b. 1938)
María Amalia León Cabral (b. 1960)
Sarah Amalia Jorge León
Lidia Josefina León Cabral (b. 1962)
José Eduardo León Cabral (1963–1975)
Marco Buenaventura Cabral Vega
Marco Antonio Cabral Bermúdez (1906–1973)
Josefina Eugenia Cabral Bermúdez (1910–1994)
Pedro Ramón Espaillat Cabral
Alejandro Augusto Espaillat Cabral
Alejandro José Espaillat Imbert
Pedro José Espaillat Vélez
Carlos José Espaillat Vélez
Fineta Rosario Espaillat Cabral
Pedro Pablo Cabral Bermúdez (1916–1988)
Lucía Amelia Cabral Arzeno de Herrera
José María Cabral Arzeno (b. 1959)
José María Cabral González (b. 1988)
Luis José Cabral Arzeno
Lucía Amelia Cabral Arzeno
Virginia Cabral Arzeno
Ramona Antonio Cabral y Báez
Eduardo Sánchez Cabral
Buenaventura Cabral y Báez
Carmen Amelia Mercedes Cabral Machado
Carlos Alberto Cabral Machado
Pablo Buenaventura Cabral Machado
Mario Fermín Cabral y Báez (1877–1961)
Manuel Antonio Cabral Tavares (1907–1999)
Alba María Antonia "Peggy" Cabral Cornero (b. 1947)
Ramón Báez Machado (1858–1929)
Buenaventura Báez Soler
Ramón Báez Romano
Ramón Buenaventura Báez Figueroa (b. 1956)
Ramón Buenaventura Báez Zeller (b. 1982)
José Ramón Báez Alvarez (b. 1999)
José Miguel Báez Figueroa
Mercedes Báez Soler
Julio Ernesto de la Rocha Báez
Ramón de la Rocha Pimentel (b. 1951)
Clarissa Altagracia de la Rocha Pimentel de Torres (b. 1959)

Notes

References

External links

|-

|-

|-

|-

|-

|-

1812 births
1884 deaths
People from Barahona Province
Dominican Republic people of Spanish descent
Presidents of the Dominican Republic
Vice presidents of the Dominican Republic
Dominican Republic military personnel